= Berbers in Mali =

Total population
- 850,000

Languages
- Berber languages (some knowledge of French)

Religion
- Sunni Islam

Berbers in Mali are Malian citizens of Berber descent or persons of Berber descent residing in Mali. Ethnic Berbers in Mali are believed to number of 850,000.
